Robert Pollin (born September 29, 1950) is an American economist, and self described socialist. He is a professor of economics at the University of Massachusetts Amherst and founding co-director of its Political Economy Research Institute (PERI). He has been described as a leftist economist and is a supporter of egalitarianism.

Career
He was the economic spokesperson in Jerry Brown's 1992 campaign for President of the United States.

Pollin moved to the University of Massachusetts Amherst's economic department from University of California, Riverside in 1998. According to Marxian economist Richard D. Wolff, Pollin's department is described as being "left Keynesians, but the Keynesianism is the theoretical frame. Marxism, for sure, is not".  Pollin states that he would be happy to hire Marxists but that economics departments do not produce them any longer.

In 2013, Pollin, with Thomas Herndon and Michael Ash from the University of Massachusetts Amherst, published a paper which found several errors in Carmen Reinhart's and Kenneth Rogoff's widely cited 2010 paper, "Growth in a Time of Debt".

Pollin and his colleagues defended Nicolas Maduro following the 2013 Venezuelan presidential election stating that audits performed by the Venezuelan government were sufficient and that Maduro won the presidency. In June 2015, the leftist Spanish party Podemos partnered with Pollin on a renewable energy plan that they said would create jobs and make Spain more independent with energy.

In April 2022, Pollin recommended that the US government purchase a controlling interest in the three dominant U.S. oil and gas corporations, ExxonMobil, Chevron, and ConocoPhillips in order to enable the phaseout of fossil fuels and the transition to clean energy.

Personal life
He is the son of Irene Pollin and Abe Pollin, the former owner of the NBA's Washington Wizards and Washington Capitals. Pollin was part of the family ownership team that sold the Wizards after his father's death.

Books 
 Transforming the US Financial System (ed., with Gary Dymski and Gerald Epstein; 1993)
 The Macroeconomics of Saving, Finance, and Investment (1997)
 Globalization and Progressive Economic Policy (ed., with Dean Baker and Gerald Epstein; 1998)
 The Living Wage: Building a Fair Economy (with Stephanie Luce; 1998)
 Contours of Descent: US Economic Fractures and the Landscape of Global Austerity (2003)
 Back To Full Employment (2012)
 Greening the Global Economy (2015)
 Climate Crisis and the Global Green New Deal (with Noam Chomsky and C. J. Polychroniou; 2020)

References

External links

 "Back to Full Employment" by Robert Pollin, Boston Review, January/February 2011
 "Tools for a New Economy" – Proposals for a financial regulatory system by Robert Pollin, Boston Review, January/February 2009
 Curriculum Vitae (March 2009)

1950 births
21st-century American economists
Living people
Place of birth missing (living people)
University of Massachusetts Amherst faculty
Washington Wizards owners
Center for Economic and Policy Research